Peperomia quadrifolia is a species of plant in the genus Peperomia of the family Piperaceae. It is endemic to Central and South America.

References

quadrifolia
Flora of Mexico
Flora of Colombia
Flora of Venezuela
Flora of Cuba
Flora of Peru